Lunkhu Deurali  is a Village Development Committee in Parbat District in the Dhawalagiri Zone of central Nepal. At the time of the 2011 Nepal census it had a population of 2546 people living in 503 individual households.

Lunkhu Deurali is one of the few VDCs in Parbat District that fully enjoys basic facilities such as electricity, drinkable water, road connection, education, communication and others. It has direct road connection with Pokhara and Kusma the later being the district headquarters. Vendors transport goods from Pokhara and Kathmandu. The majority in Lunkhu are Bramhin, followed by Nepali, Uchhai, Sunar, Pariyar and Malla.

 Shree Sagarmatha Prathameek Bidhyalaya
 Shree Mahendra Jyoti Mandhyamik Bidhyalaya.
 Shree Saraswati Prathameek Bidhyalaya.
 Deurali English Boarding School.
Shree Chanaute Prathameek Bidhyalaya

References

External links
UN map of the municipalities of Parbat District

Populated places in Parbat District